Unione Sportiva Dilettantistica Sestri Levante 1919 is an Italian association football club located in Sestri Levante, Liguria. Currently it plays in Serie D.

History 
The club was founded in 1919.

Serie C 
It took part to Serie C for three seasons in 1946–1949.
After this years Sestri Levante is playing mostly in minor categories such as Promozione, Eccellenza, and Serie D

Serie D 
In the season 2011–12 the team was promoted from Eccellenza Liguria to Serie D.

Players

Current squad

Colors and badge 
Its colors are red and blue.

External links 
 Official homepage

Association football clubs established in 1919
Football clubs in Liguria
1919 establishments in Italy